Guy Liebmann (born April 27, 1936) is a former American politician from Oklahoma City, Oklahoma. He is a member of the Republican Party and was a former state representative and mayor. He attended Classen High School and graduated in 1954. Liebmann graduated from the University of Oklahoma.

Political career
He served in the Oklahoma House of Representatives where he represented the 82nd District from 2005 to 2013 when he lost in the Republican primary. He also served as acting Mayor of Oklahoma City from 2003–2004, when Mick Cornett won the election to replace Kirk Humphreys. Liebmann previously served as an Oklahoma City Council member, and in the United States Marine Corps.

References

1936 births
Living people
Classen School of Advanced Studies alumni
Mayors of Oklahoma City
Republican Party members of the Oklahoma House of Representatives
People from Shawnee, Oklahoma
United States Marine Corps officers
University of Oklahoma alumni